9799 Thronium, provisional designation: , is a large Jupiter trojan from the Greek camp and the parent body of a small, unnamed asteroid family , approximately  in diameter. It was discovered on 8 September 1996, by American astronomer Timothy Spahr at the Catalina Station of the Steward Observatory near Tucson, Arizona, in the United States. The assumed C-type asteroid belongs to the 50 largest Jupiter trojans and has a relatively long rotation period of 21.52 hours. It was named for the ancient Greek city of Thronium mentioned in the Iliad.

Orbit and classification 

Thronium is a dark Jovian asteroid orbiting in the leading Greek camp at Jupiter's  Lagrangian point, 60° ahead of the Gas Giant's orbit in a 1:1 resonance (see Trojans in astronomy). It orbits the Sun at a distance of 4.9–5.4 AU once every 11 years and 10 months (4,320 days; semi-major axis of 5.19 AU). Its orbit has an eccentricity of 0.05 and an inclination of 31° with respect to the ecliptic.

Parent of a small Trojan family 

Thronium is also the parent body of a small, unnamed asteroid family with the family identification number 006. The family seems to be young, compact and consist of only 7 known members. Only a few families have been identified among the Jovian asteroids; four of them in the Greek camp. This potentially collisional family was first characterized by Jakub Rozehnal and Miroslav Brož in 2014.

Numbering and naming 

This minor planet was numbered on 8 December 1998 after its orbit had been sufficiently secured. On 14 May 2021, the object was named by the Working Group Small Body Nomenclature (WGSBN), after the ancient Greek city of Thronium. In Greek mythology and mentioned in the Iliad (Catalogue of Ships), it was one of the places from which the Locrians joined the Achaeans.

Physical characteristics 

 is an assumed, carbonaceous C-type asteroid. Nesvorný does not give an overall spectral type for this unnamed family, but derives an albedo of 0.06 (see below), which is also typical for carbonaceous C-types.

Rotation period 

Lightcurve analysis gave a longer-than average rotation period of 21.52 hours with a brightness amplitude of 0.16 magnitude.

Diameter and albedo 

According to the surveys carried out by the Infrared Astronomical Satellite IRAS, the Japanese Akari satellite and the NEOWISE mission of NASA's Wide-field Infrared Survey Explorer,  measures between 64.87 and 72.42 kilometers in diameter and its surface has an albedo between 0.037 and 0.060.

The Collaborative Asteroid Lightcurve Link derives an albedo of 0.0603 and a diameter of 65.06 kilometers based on an absolute magnitude of 9.6.

References

External links 
 Long-term evolution of asteroid families among Jovian Trojans, Jakub Rozehnal and Miroslav Brož (2014)
 Asteroid Lightcurve Database (LCDB), query form (info )
 Discovery Circumstances: Numbered Minor Planets (5001)-(10000) – Minor Planet Center
 
 

009799
Discoveries by Timothy B. Spahr
Named minor planets
19960908